Collagen alpha-1(XIV) chain is a protein that in humans is encoded by the COL14A1 gene.
It likely plays a role in collagen binding and cell-cell adhesion.

References

Further reading

Collagens